Kamarian is an extinct Austronesian language. It was spoken at the southwestern coast of Seram Island in the Moluccas in eastern Indonesia.

References

Central Maluku languages
Languages of the Maluku Islands
Extinct languages of Oceania
Languages extinct in the 2000s